Hayler is a surname. Notable people with the surname include:

Richard Hayler, English CFO, International Valuation Standard Setter, Charity Board Member and former Expert Witness
Andy Hayler, English data warehousing professional and food critic
Damon Hayler (born 1976), Australian snowboarder
Franz Hayler (1900–1972), German salesman
Robert W. Hayler, Admiral, USN

See also
Huyler